The 1972 Notre Dame Fighting Irish football team represented the University of Notre Dame during the 1972 NCAA University Division football season.

Schedule

Game summaries

Northwestern

Purdue

Michigan State

Pittsburgh

Missouri

Texas Christian

Navy

Air Force

Miami (Florida)

Southern Cal

Orange Bowl vs. Nebraska

Roster

References

Notre Dame
Notre Dame Fighting Irish football seasons
Notre Dame Fighting Irish football